Patricia Kathryn "Pat" Piper (July 16, 1934 – January 31, 2016) was a Minnesota politician and member of the Minnesota Senate and the Minnesota House of Representatives. A member of the Minnesota Democratic–Farmer–Labor Party (DFL), she represented District 27 in the Senate and 31B in the House, which includes portions of Freeborn and Mower counties in southeastern Minnesota. She was a religious education director, ecumenical resource center/consultant/teacher and workshop leader.

Early life, education, and career
Born in Delavan, Minnesota, Piper was one of nine children. Her father fought in World War II. Piper grew up in Blue Earth, Minnesota. She received a B.A. in elementary education from College of Saint Teresa and a B.A. in religious education from The Catholic University of America. Piper was earlier a Roman Catholic religious sister who worked as a religious education director, ecumenical resource center/consultant/teacher and workshop leader at Christian Education Center.

Minnesota House of Representatives

Elections
Piper was first elected in 1982 and reelected in 1984. In 1986 she ran for State Senate instead of seeking reelection.

Committee assignments
For the 74th Legislative Session, Piper was a part of:
Governmental Operations Committee
Governmental Operations Subcommittee: Property Tax Study Commission 
Health and Human Services Committee
Health and Human Services Subcommittee: Health Care 
Local and Urban Affairs Committee
Local and Urban Affairs Subcommittee: Local Government Affairs

For the 73rd Legislative Session, Piper was a part of:
Energy Committee
Energy Subcommittee: Energy and Society 
General Legislation and Veterans Affairs Committee
General Legislation and Veterans Affairs Subcommittee: Gaming Division 
Regulated Industries Committee
Regulated Industries Subcommittee: Beverage

Tenure
Piper represented District 31A in the Minnesota House of Representatives from January 4, 1983, to January 6, 1987 (73rd and 74th Legislative Sessions).

Minnesota Senate

Elections
Piper was elected to the Minnesota Senate in 1986, and reelected in 1990, 1992 and 1996. She lost reelection in 2000 to Grace Schwab.

Committee assignments
For the 80th and 81st Legislative Sessions, Piper was a part of:
Agriculture and Rural Development Committee
Children, Families and Learning Committee (Chair) 
Children, Families and Learning/Education Finance Subcommittee: Family and Early Childhood Education Budget Division (Chair) 
Education Finance Committee
Health and Family Security Committee
Health and Family Security/Human Resources Finance Subcommittee: Health and Family Security Budget Division 
Rules and Administration Committee
Rules and Administration Subcommittee: Permanent and Joint Rules 
Rules and Administration Subcommittee: Personnel

For the 79th Legislative Session, Piper was a part of:
Family Services Committee (Chair) 
Finance Committee
Finance Subcommittee: Finance State Government Division 
Health Care Committee
Health Care Subcommittee: Health Care and Family Services Finance Division 
Rules and Administration Committee
Rules and Administration Subcommittee: Permanent and Joint Rules

For the 78th Legislative Session, Piper was a part of:
Crime Prevention Committee 
Family Services Committee (Chair) 
Finance Committee
Finance Subcommittee: Finance State Government Division 
Health Care Committee
Health Care Subcommittee: Health Care and Family Services Finance Division 
Rules and Administration Committee

For the 77th Legislative Session, Piper was a part of:
Elections and Ethics Committee
Employment Committee
Energy and Public Utilities Committee
Finance Committee
Finance Subcommittee: Education Division 
Finance Subcommittee: Health and Human Services Division 
Health and Human Services Committee
Health and Human Services Subcommittee: Health Care Access Division (Chair)

For the 76th Legislative Session, Piper was a part of:
Employment Committee
Finance Committee
Finance Subcommittee: Health and Human Services Division 
Health and Human Services Committee
Health and Human Services Subcommittee: Social Services and Government Administration (Chair) 
Health and Human Services Subcommittee: Welfare Reform 
Public Utilities and Energy Committee
Public Utilities and Energy Subcommittee: Energy 
Public Utilities and Energy Subcommittee: Utilities (Chair)

For the 75th Legislative Session, Piper was a part of:
Employment Committee
Employment Subcommittee: Injured Workers' Compensation 
Finance Committee
Finance Subcommittee: Health and Human Services Division 
Health and Human Services Committee
Health and Human Services Subcommittee: Social Services and Government Administration (Chair) 
Health and Human Services Subcommittee: Welfare Reform Division 
Public Utilities and Energy Committee
Public Utilities and Energy Subcommittee: Alternative Energy

Tenure
Piper was sworn in on January 6, 1987, serving in the 75th, 76th, 77th, 78th 79th, 80th, and 81st Legislative Sessions. She championed issues such as family support, children, health, human services, and education. She was part of the "Gang of Seven" (with Linda Berglin, Paul Ogren, Duane Benson, Dave Gruenes, Brad Stanius, and Lee Greenfield) that worked to pass bipartisan Minnesota Care. She also pushed legislation to help the Exol Ethanol plant in Glenville, Minnesota. Piper convinced a Senate committee to join her in singing the "Itsy Bitsy Spider" song when children visited the state Capitol to testify about welfare issues. She authored legislation that would require insurance companies to pay for bone marrow transplants as an experimental procedure for women with breast cancer.

Post-legislative career
Piper suggested that she'd apply for the position of chaplain of the Senate, where she could give her numerous original prayers an appropriate audience. Piper also suggested she would be the appropriate candidate to become the director of a child-care center in the state Capitol. Piper stayed involved in the Austin Community, running the Senate Campaign for KAAL TV 6 Anchor Terry Kelley and attending public events. She also became a board member for Minnesota Partnership for Action Against Tobacco.

Personal life
Piper was single and lived in Austin, Minnesota. She died at Cottagewood Senior Community in Rochester, Minnesota.

References

External links

|-

1934 births
2016 deaths
Women state legislators in Minnesota
Democratic Party Minnesota state senators
Democratic Party members of the Minnesota House of Representatives
Educators from Minnesota
American women educators
People from Austin, Minnesota
People from Faribault County, Minnesota
College of Saint Teresa alumni
Catholic University of America alumni
20th-century American Roman Catholic nuns
Catholics from Minnesota
21st-century American Roman Catholic nuns